Papiernia may refer to the following places:
Papiernia, Kielce County in Świętokrzyskie Voivodeship (south-central Poland)
Papiernia, Końskie County in Świętokrzyskie Voivodeship (south-central Poland)
Papiernia, Włoszczowa County in Świętokrzyskie Voivodeship (south-central Poland)
Papiernia, Masovian Voivodeship (east-central Poland)
Papiernia, Leszno County in Greater Poland Voivodeship (west-central Poland)
Papiernia, Ostrów Wielkopolski County in Greater Poland Voivodeship (west-central Poland)
Papiernia, Pomeranian Voivodeship (north Poland)
Papiernia, Warmian-Masurian Voivodeship (north Poland)